Jannat Shahr (also known as Kūshk-e Jannat and Jannat) is a city in the Central District of Darab City, Fars Province, Iran.  At the 2006 census, its population was 10,817, in 2,373 families.

References

Populated places in Darab County

Cities in Fars Province